Henry W. Majlinger (December 27, 1919 – September 8, 1999) was an American football and baseball coach.  He was the third head football coach at the Teachers College of Connecticut—now known as Central Connecticut State University—, serving for six seasons, from 1953 to 1958, and compiling a record of 17–22–2.  Majlinger was also the head baseball coach at Central Connecticut from 1949 to 1978, tallying a mark of 353–168.

Head coaching record

Football

References

1919 births
1999 deaths
American football tackles
Central Connecticut Blue Devils baseball coaches
Central Connecticut Blue Devils football coaches
NYU Violets football players
People from Indiana County, Pennsylvania